Wasit Sport Club, is an Iraqi football team based in Wasit, that plays in Iraq Division Three.

Managerial history 
 Safaa Jawad
 Salih Joban

See also 
 1998–99 Iraq FA Cup
 2000–01 Iraqi Elite League
 2002–03 Iraq FA Cup

References

External links
 Wasit SC on Goalzz.com
 Iraq Clubs- Foundation Dates

1997 establishments in Iraq
Association football clubs established in 1997
Football clubs in Wasit